This page lists all described species of the spider family Hexathelidae accepted by the World Spider Catalog :

† Alioatrax

† Alioatrax Wunderlich, 2017
 † A. incertus Wunderlich, 2017

Bymainiella

Bymainiella Raven, 1978
 B. lugubris Raven, 1978 — Australia (New South Wales)
 B. monteithi Raven, 1978 — Australia (Queensland, New South Wales)
 B. polesoni Raven, 1978 — Australia (New South Wales)
 B. terraereginae (Raven, 1976) (type) — Australia (Queensland, New South Wales)

Hexathele

Hexathele Ausserer, 1871
 H. cantuaria Forster, 1968 — New Zealand
 H. cavernicola Forster, 1968 — New Zealand
 H. exemplar Parrott, 1960 — New Zealand
 H. hochstetteri Ausserer, 1871 (type) — New Zealand
 H. huka Forster, 1968 — New Zealand
 H. huttoni Hogg, 1908 — New Zealand
 H. kohua Forster, 1968 — New Zealand
 H. maitaia Forster, 1968 — New Zealand
 H. nigra Forster, 1968 — New Zealand
 H. otira Forster, 1968 — New Zealand
 H. para Forster, 1968 — New Zealand
 H. petriei Goyen, 1887 — New Zealand
 H. pukea Forster, 1968 — New Zealand
 H. putuna Forster, 1968 — New Zealand
 H. ramsayi Forster, 1968 — New Zealand
 H. rupicola Forster, 1968 — New Zealand
 H. taumara Forster, 1968 — New Zealand
 H. waipa Forster, 1968 — New Zealand
 H. waita Forster, 1968 — New Zealand
 H. wiltoni Forster, 1968 — New Zealand

Mediothele

Mediothele Raven & Platnick, 1978
 M. anae Ríos-Tamayo & Goloboff, 2012 — Chile
 M. australis Raven & Platnick, 1978 (type) — Chile
 M. lagos Ríos-Tamayo & Goloboff, 2012 — Chile
 M. linares Ríos-Tamayo & Goloboff, 2012 — Chile
 M. minima Ríos-Tamayo & Goloboff, 2012 — Chile
 M. nahuelbuta Ríos-Tamayo & Goloboff, 2012 — Chile

Paraembolides

Paraembolides Raven, 1980
 P. boycei (Raven, 1978) (type) — Australia (Queensland)
 P. boydi (Raven, 1978) — Australia (New South Wales)
 P. brindabella (Raven, 1978) — Australia (New South Wales, Australian Capital Territory)
 P. cannoni (Raven, 1978) — Australia (Queensland)
 P. grayi (Raven, 1978) — Australia (New South Wales)
 P. montisbossi (Raven, 1978) — Australia (New South Wales)
 P. tubrabucca (Raven, 1978) — Australia (New South Wales)
 P. variabilis (Raven, 1978) — Australia (New South Wales)

Plesiothele

Plesiothele Raven, 1978
 P. fentoni (Hickman, 1936) (type) — Australia (Tasmania)

Scotinoecus

Scotinoecus Simon, 1892
 S. cinereopilosus (Simon, 1889) (type) — Chile
 S. fasciatus Tullgren, 1901 — Chile, Argentina
 S. major Ríos-Tamayo & Goloboff, 2012 — Chile
 S. ruiles Ríos-Tamayo & Goloboff, 2012 — Chile

Teranodes

Teranodes Raven, 1985
 T. montanus (Hickman, 1927) (type) — Australia (Tasmania, Victoria)
 T. otwayensis (Raven, 1978) — Australia (Victoria)

References

Hexathelidae